Michinori (written: 道教, 通教, 通憲 or 倫範) is a masculine Japanese given name. Notable people with the name include:

 (1106–1160), Japanese scholar and Buddhist monk
 (1315–1349), Japanese kugyō
 (1910–1945), Japanese military officer
 (born 1990), Japanese mixed martial artist 
 (born 1953), Japanese mathematician

Japanese masculine given names